Everybody Knows Johnny Hodges is an album by jazz saxophonist Johnny Hodges, released on Impulse! Records in 1964.

Reception

In a review for AllMusic, Michael G. Nastos wrote: "It would be difficult to pick a favorite or a clunker, and you'd be hard-pressed to find anything more inspired or another project loaded with this much talent. Everybody knows Johnny Hodges and this stellar collection of all-stars, because they are absolutely the best at what they do."

The authors of The Penguin Guide to Jazz Recordings awarded the album a full 4 stars, calling it "essential."

Track listing
"Everybody Knows" (Johnny Hodges) – 7:25
"A Flower is a Lovesome Thing" (Billy Strayhorn) – 3:04
"Papa Knows" (J. Hodges) – 6:52
"310 Blues" (Strayhorn) – 4:34
"The Jeep is Jumpin'" (Duke Ellington, Hodges, Strayhorn) – 2:45
"Main Stem" (Ellington) – 3:28
"Medley: I Let a Song Go Out of My Heart/Don't Get Around Much Anymore" (Ellington, Irving Mills, Henry Nemo, John Redmond, Bob Russell – 4:44
"Open Mike" (Cat Anderson) – 3:09

The CD version adds 8 bonus tracks, consisting of the entire album Inspired/Abandon by Lawrence Brown's All-Stars feat. Johnny Hodges:
"Stompy Jones" (Ellington) – 4:00
"Mood Indigo" (Barney Bigard, Ellington, Mills) – 4:25
"Good Queen Bess" (J. Hodges) – 3:07
"Little Brother" (J. Hodges, Cue Hodges) – 5:43
"Jeep's Blues" (Ellington, J. Hodges) – 5:43
"Do Nothin' Till You Hear from Me" (Ellington, Russell) – 2:34
"Ruint" (Ellington, J. Hodges) – 3:21
"Sassy Cue" (J. Hodges, C. Hodges) – 3:42

Personnel

Performance

Johnny Hodges – alto sax
Cat Anderson – trumpet
Harold Ashby – tenor sax
Lawrence Brown – trombone
Harry Carney – baritone sax
Buster Cooper – trombone
Richard Davis – bass
Rolf Ericson – trumpet
Paul Gonsalves – tenor sax
Jimmy Hamilton – clarinet, tenor sax

Johnny Hodges, Jr. – drums
Gus Johnson – drums
Herb Jones – trumpet
Jimmy Jones – piano
Ray Nance – trumpet, violin, vocals
Russell Procope – clarinet, alto sax
Ernie Shepard – bass
Grady Tate – drums
Britt Woodman – trombone

Production

Cue Hodges – composer
Billy Strayhorn – composer
Bob Thiele – original session producer
Doreen Kalcich – assistant producer
Bob Simpson – engineer
Rudy Van Gelder – engineer
Joseph Doughney – post-production
Michael Landy – post-production
Adam Zelinka – post-production
Michael Pollard – production coordination
Michael Cuscuna – reissue producer
Erick Labson – digital remastering

Dave Grusin – executive producer
Larry Rosen – executive producer
Stanley Dance – liner notes
Frank Driggs – photography
Charles Stewart – photography
Emili Bogin – graphic design
David Gibb – graphic design
Scott Johnson – graphic design
Andy Ruggirello – graphic design
Dan Serrano – graphic design
Andy Baltimore – creative director

References

1964 albums
Albums produced by Bob Thiele
Johnny Hodges albums
Impulse! Records albums
Albums produced by Michael Cuscuna